Istanbullik Milliarder — a comedy film shot in Istanbul, Turkey by Turkish and Uzbek filmmakers. The roles in the film were played by Uzbek actors, and the filming process was carried out by Turkish and Uzbek cameramen. The film premiered on November 29, 2019, in Uzbekistan. This film was one of the most watched films in Uzbekistan. The budget and gross of the film have not been announced.

Plot

Cast 
 Muhammad Iso Abdulhairov: Qobil
 Sitora Alimjanova: Sitora
 Umid Irgashev: Aziz
 Zuhra Soliyeva: Farida
 Asqar Hikmatov : Muzaffar
 Sardor Zoirov : Azizbek
 Umid Zokirov: Umid
 Bahshillo Fatullayev as Erkin

References

External links 
 

2019 films
2010s children's comedy films